The 12 Hours of Sebring Grand Prix of Endurance, was the third round of the 1988 IMSA GT Championship and was held at the Sebring International Raceway, on March 19, 1988. Victory overall went to the No. 86 Bayside Disposal Racing Porsche 962 driven by Klaus Ludwig and Hans-Joachim Stuck.

Race results

Class winners in bold.

References

IMSA GTP
12 Hours of Sebring
12 Hours of Sebring
Sebring
12 Hours of Sebring